Larimore is a city in Grand Forks County, North Dakota, United States. It is located three miles south of the junction of U.S. Route 2 and North Dakota Highway 18. Larimore is part of the "Grand Forks, ND-MN Metropolitan Statistical Area" or "Greater Grand Forks". The population was 1,260 at the 2020 census. Larimore was founded in 1881.

History
Larimore got its start in the year 1881, following construction of the railroad through the territory. It is named for N. G. Larimore, who owned a large farm in the area.

Geography

Climate

Demographics

2010 census
As of the census of 2010, there were 1,346 people, 552 households, and 358 families residing in the city. The racial makeup of the city was 92.3% White, 0.8% African American, 1.6% Native American, 0.4% Asian, 2.7% from other races, and 2.2% from two or more races. Hispanic or Latino of any race were 4.2% of the population.

There were 552 households, of which 29.5% had children under the age of 18 living with them, 53.3% were married couples living together, 7.6% had a female householder with no husband present, 4.0% had a male householder with no wife present, and 35.1% were non-families. 30.8% of all households were made up of individuals, and 10.1% had someone living alone who was 65 years of age or older. The average household size was 2.37 and the average family size was 2.96.

The median age in the city was 41.6 years. 23.7% of residents were under the age of 18; 6.9% were between the ages of 18 and 24; 23.9% were from 25 to 44; 27.5% were from 45 to 64; and 18.1% were 65 years of age or older. The gender makeup of the city was 48.1% male and 51.9% female.

2000 census
As of the census of 2000, there were 1,433 people, 576 households, and 377 families residing in the city. The population density was 2,368.0 people per square mile (907.0/km2). There were 620 housing units at an average density of 1,024.5 per square mile (392.4/km2). The racial makeup of the city was 96.09% White, 0.70% African American, 1.47% Native American, 0.63% Asian, 0.21% from other races, and 0.91% from two or more races. Hispanic or Latino of any race were 1.12% of the population.

There were 576 households, out of which 32.8% had children under the age of 18 living with them, 54.5% were married couples living together, 7.6% had a female householder with no husband present, and 34.5% were non-families. 30.7% of all households were made up of individuals, and 16.3% had someone living alone who was 65 years of age or older. The average household size was 2.42 and the average family size was 3.06.

In the city, the population was spread out, with 27.8% under the age of 18, 5.4% from 18 to 24, 27.4% from 25 to 44, 19.4% from 45 to 64, and 20.2% who were 65 years of age or older. The median age was 39 years. For every 100 females, there were 91.8 males. For every 100 females age 18 and over, there were 90.5 males.

The median income for a household in the city was $33,292, and the median income for a family was $40,542. Males had a median income of $29,375 versus $20,417 for females. The per capita income for the city was $16,271. About 6.1% of families and 7.4% of the population were below the poverty line, including 8.6% of those under age 18 and 10.7% of those age 65 or over.

Today

Unlike many of small towns in North Dakota, Larimore has maintained a relatively stable population for the last forty years. Its close proximity to employment opportunities in Grand Forks and at the Grand Forks Air Force Base have led the town to become an attractive choice for commuters desiring lower housing costs and a small-town environment. Although new housing construction has been fairly stagnant during the last fifteen years, a number of new homes have been built throughout the town in the last several years where lots have been available. A larger number of homes have been constructed outside of the city near Larimore Dam and along the Turtle River, north and east of the town. Many of these homes are far larger and more expensive than those being built within the city limits.

In rural Larimore, population density is higher east of the town than towards the west. Although the area has lost farming households throughout many decades, many farms have been turned into horse ranches, hobby farms, or simply homesteads for commuters who wish to have more area than they would otherwise have in town.

Although Larimore has maintained its residential base, it has faced more difficult challenges in regards to its commercial establishments. Like numerous small communities throughout the Great Plains, the 1980s were a devastating time for local main street businesses. Downturns in the farm economy and increased shopping options in larger, nearby cities such as Grand Forks, led to many store closures in Larimore that included everything from a farm implement dealer to a grocery store. The business district has since "bottomed out" and many of the once abandoned buildings have either been renovated for other uses or demolished and replaced with new structures. Abandoned lots and empty, deteriorating buildings still dot much of the downtown area of Larimore.

Notable people

 Eli C. D. Shortridge, third Governor of North Dakota from 1893 to 1895, was a resident of Larimore
 Truck Hannah, was a Major League Baseball catcher for the New York Yankees and a member of the Pacific Coast League Hall of Fame. He was born in Larimore in 1889
 LeRoy Mason, was a movie actor, born in Larimore in 1903
 Clint Hill, United States Secret Service agent who was in the presidential motorcade during the assassination of John F. Kennedy on November 22, 1963 in Dallas, Texas. During the assassination Hill ran immediately to the presidential limousine, leaped onto the back of it, and shielded Jackie Kennedy and the already stricken president with his body as the car raced to Parkland Memorial Hospital. Hill was born in Larimore in 1932

Sites of interest

 Turtle River State Park – one of the largest state parks in eastern North Dakota
 Larimore City Hall – Historic former city hall building. Now houses a community museum.
 Larimore Dam – a recreational area along a reservoir on the Turtle River. Attractions include a beach, fishing, camping, and swimming.
 Myra Arboretum

Climate
This climatic region is typified by large seasonal temperature differences, with warm to hot (and often humid) summers and cold (sometimes severely cold) winters.  According to the Köppen Climate Classification system, Larimore has a humid continental climate, abbreviated "Dfb" on climate maps.

References

External links

Larimore centennial: Larimore, North Dakota, July 11–19 from the Digital Horizons website
1981 high school reunion in Larimore's centennial year from the Digital Horizons website
Larimore, North Dakota: a souvenir (1901) from the Digital Horizons website

Cities in North Dakota
Cities in Grand Forks County, North Dakota
Populated places established in 1881
1881 establishments in Dakota Territory